Bartuska or Bartuška is a surname. Notable people with the surname include:

Ann Bartuska (born 1953), American ecologist and biologist
Franz Daniel Bartuska (in office 1731–1732), mayor of Vienna
Vincas Bartuška (1901–1988), Lithuanian footballer

Lithuanian-language surnames